Mian Mohsin Latif  is a Pakistani politician who was a member of the Provincial Assembly of the Punjab between 2008 and 2015.

Early life
He was born in Lahore to Mian Abdul Latif, brother of Kulsoom Nawaz Sharif. He graduated from Forman Christian College in 1992.

He is thus a great grandson of the legendary Gama Pehlwan & grandson of Dr. Abdul Hafeez of Misri Shah, Lahore who ran a dispensary from 1938 to 1999.  In 2018, Mohsin Latif opened a dispensary free to the public at the same location in memory of his father & grandfather.

Political career
He was elected from PP-147 – Lahore as a candidate of Pakistan Muslim League (Nawaz) (PML-N) in 2008 Pakistani general election. He was subsequently re-elected in the 2013 2013 Pakistani general election and was MPA until the 2015 by-election.

Business career 
Mohsin Latif is an interior designer by profession & runs Touchwood Interiors (based at 14 Shadman behind Soneri Bank on Jail Road, Lahore).

References

Punjab MPAs 2008–2013
Pakistan Muslim League (N) MPAs (Punjab)
Politicians from Lahore
Sharif family
Pakistani people of Kashmiri descent
1971 births
Forman Christian College alumni
Living people